Kimball Union Academy is a private boarding school located in New Hampshire.  Founded in 1813, it is the 22nd oldest boarding school in the United States. The academy's mission is to "create a deep sense of belonging for every member of our community. Through intentionally designed experiences and challenges, our students develop the knowledge, voice, and character to live with purpose and integrity." It is located in the upper Connecticut River Valley village of Meriden, New Hampshire.

The academy's  village campus is 2½ hours via major highways from Boston, Massachusetts, and Hartford, Connecticut. Nearby bus, train, and plane terminals link the area directly with Boston, New York City, and Manchester, New Hampshire. The academy is governed by a 17-member board of trustees.

Notable alumni

Abdul-Malik Abu (born 1995), basketball player in the Israeli Premier Basketball League
F. Lee Bailey, defense attorney
Frederick H. Billings, lawyer, financier and President of the Northern Pacific Railway
Francis B. Brewer, congressman
Augusta Cooper Bristol (1835–1910), poet, lecturer
John Graham Brooks (1846-1938), sociologist and author
Henry E. Burnham, U.S. senator 
Frank Gay Clarke, congressman 
William Cogswell, congressman, general 
William N. Cohen, Justice of the New York Supreme Court
Frank Dunklee Currier, congressman 
Irving W. Drew, U.S. senator
Kasim Edebali, NFL player 
Jonathan Clarkson Gibbs, Presbyterian minister, Reconstruction politician 
Louis B. Goodall, congressman 
Broughton Harris, Vermont newspaper editor and businessman who was one of the Runaway Officials of 1851 as Secretary of the Utah Territory
Doc Hazelton, major league baseball player and college coach
Chester Bradley Jordan, Governor of New Hampshire 
Ernest Everett Just, African American biologist
Edward Chalmers Leavitt, artist 
John C. Lord, Presbyterian minister and nativist 
James D. Lynch, African American politician, minister 
Charles W. Porter, Secretary of State of Vermont
Samuel L. Powers, congressman 
Will Sheff, rock musician
Steven Sotloff, Israeli-American journalist
Dana Stone, Vietnam War photographer
Bainbridge Wadleigh, U.S. senator 
Aldace F. Walker, railroad president 
James M. Warner, Civil War general, industrialist 
Augustus Washington, African American photographer 
William Wells, Civil War general, Medal of Honor winner 
Andrew Wheating, Olympian
Benjamin F. Whidden, first ambassador to Haiti

See also

New Hampshire Historical Marker No. 77: Kimball Union Academy

References

External links

 
 
 

Boarding schools in New Hampshire
Educational institutions established in 1813
Preparatory schools in New Hampshire
Private high schools in New Hampshire
Schools in Sullivan County, New Hampshire
1813 establishments in the United States